Sarangesa tricerata, commonly known as the tricerate elfin, is a species of butterfly in the family Hesperiidae. It is found in Gambia, Guinea, Sierra Leone, Ivory Coast, Ghana, Togo, Nigeria, Cameroon, Gabon, the Republic of the Congo, the Central African Republic, the Democratic Republic of the Congo and Tanzania. The habitat consists of drier forests.

Adult males are attracted to bird droppings.

Subspecies
Sarangesa tricerata tricerata (Gambia, Sierra Leone, to Cameroon, Gabon, Democratic Republic of Congo)
Sarangesa tricerata compacta Evans, 1951 (western Tanzania)

References

Butterflies described in 1891
Celaenorrhinini
Butterflies of Africa